Kızlar Kalesi (literally "Maidens' castle") is a castle ruin in Mersin Province , Turkey.

Geography
Travelers to the castle follow Turkish state highway  which connects Tarsus to north. The last portion of the road is earth road.

History
The castle can be dated back to the 4th century (late Roman Empire era). Judging from the masonry and the repairs, it was also used in later ages.

Description
The two-storey high castle was actually an observation tower. It has no gate and it is thought that its original entrance was via a wooden ladder. It has also an inner building. The rooms are arched and vaulted.

References

Tarsus District
Ruined castles in Turkey
Archaeological sites in Mersin Province, Turkey
Byzantine fortifications in Turkey